UFC 37.5: As Real As It Gets was a mixed martial arts event held by the Ultimate Fighting Championship at the Bellagio Hotel and Casino in Las Vegas, Nevada on June 22, 2002.

Background
The fight card was headlined by a bout between top contenders, returning Vitor Belfort, and Chuck Liddell. UFC 37.5 was the first UFC event to feature Joe Rogan as a color commentator but he would leave again to host Fear Factor, and return at UFC 40. Joe made several UFC appearances prior to UFC 37.5 as the behind-the-scenes interviewer starting at UFC 12.

UFC 37.5 was a last-minute event specifically held to promote the UFC on Fox Sports Net's The Best Damn Sports Show Period, where the "best fight" of the night was to air during the BDSSP'''s "All Star Summer" celebration in June 2002. The fight aired was Steve Berger vs Robbie Lawler, which has the distinction of being the first mixed martial arts (MMA) fight to be aired on US cable television. It also aired in Free-to-Air television in Brazil for first time at SBT, Vitor Belfort had previously participated at the network's reality show Casa dos Artistas (The House of Artists'').

The event featured only six fights, which is a much smaller card than others under the UFC banner at the time, and was not broadcast on Pay-per-view until August 16th. The number 37.5 was used because UFC 38 had already been announced and marketed in England, where the UFC was making their debut just three weeks later.

Results

See also
 Ultimate Fighting Championship
 List of UFC champions
 List of UFC events
 2002 in UFC

References

External links
 

Ultimate Fighting Championship events
2002 in mixed martial arts
Mixed martial arts in Las Vegas
2002 in sports in Nevada